On the Beach is a 1959 American post-apocalyptic science fiction drama film from United Artists starring Gregory Peck, Ava Gardner, Fred Astaire, and Anthony Perkins.  Produced and directed by Stanley Kramer, it is based on Nevil Shute's 1957 novel On the Beach depicting the aftermath of a nuclear war. Unlike the novel, no one is assigned blame for starting the war, which attributes global annihilation to fear compounded by accident or misjudgment.

Plot

In 1964, World War III has devastated the Northern Hemisphere, killing all humans there. Air currents are slowly carrying the fallout to the Southern Hemisphere, where Melbourne, Australia will be the last major city on Earth to perish.

The American nuclear submarine USS Sawfish, commanded by Capt. Dwight Towers, arrives in Melbourne and is placed under Royal Australian Navy command. Peter Holmes, a young Australian Naval officer with a wife and infant child, is assigned to be Towers's liaison. Holmes invites Towers to his home for a party, where Towers meets Julian Osborn, a depressive nuclear scientist who helped build the bombs, and Moira Davidson, a lonely alcoholic with whom Towers develops a tentative attraction. Although Moira falls in love with Towers, he finds himself unable to return her feelings, because he can't bring himself to admit his wife and children in the US are dead.

Meanwhile, a new scientific theory postulates that radiation levels in the Northern Hemisphere might have fallen faster than anticipated, suggesting radiation may disperse before reaching the Southern Hemisphere, or at least leaving Antarctica habitable. Soon after, the Australians also detect an incomprehensible continuous Morse code signal coming from the West Coast of the United States, where there should be nobody alive to send it. Towers is ordered to take the Sawfish, with Peter and Julian, to investigate. 

Arriving at Point Barrow, Alaska, the sub crew discovers the radiation levels are still highly lethal. The dispersal theory is incorrect. There will be no salvation from the radiation. Stopping next in San Francisco, Sawfish finds the city devoid of life. A crew member with family in the city deserts and swims ashore, so he can die at home. 

The submarine next stops at a refinery near San Diego, which has been pinpointed as the source of the mysterious Morse signals. A crew member discovers the power source is still running on automatic control. Nearby, a telegraph key has become entangled in a window shade's pull cord and a half-full Coca-Cola bottle, and is being randomly pulled by an ocean breeze, causing the radio signals. 

Sawfish returns to Australia to await the inevitable. Towers is reunited with Moira at her father's farm. He learns that all US Navy personnel in Brisbane are dead and he has been given command of all remaining US Naval forces. Osborn, having bought the fastest Ferrari in Australia, wins the Australian Grand Prix, in which many racers, with nothing left to lose, die in fiery crashes.

Fulfilling Towers's wish, Moira has used her connections to get the trout season opened early. Towers and Moira go on a fishing trip to the country. As drunken revelers sing "Waltzing Matilda" in the hotel bar, Towers and Moira make love in their room.

Returning to Melbourne, Towers learns the first of his crew members has radiation sickness. There is little time left. Towers takes a vote among his crew, who decide they want to return to the United States to die. Osborn shuts himself in a garage with his Ferrari and starts the engine, to end his life by carbon monoxide poisoning. Others queue to receive government-issued suicide pills. Before they take their pills, Peter and Mary reminisce about the day they met, "on the beach."

Towers says farewell to Moira at the docks. Choosing duty over love, he takes the Sawfish back to sea. Heartbroken, Moira watches from a cliff as the Sawfish submerges.

Within a few days, the streets of Melbourne are empty. A Salvation Army street banner, seen multiple times before in the film, reads: "There is still time .. Brother".

Cast

 Gregory Peck as Commander Dwight Lionel Towers, USS Sawfish
 Ava Gardner as Moira Davidson, Towers' Australian love interest
 Fred Astaire as Julian Osborn, Australian scientist
 Anthony Perkins as Lieutenant Commander Peter Holmes, Royal Australian Navy
 Donna Anderson as Mary Holmes, Peter's wife
 John Tate as Admiral Bridie, Royal Australian Navy
 Harp McGuire as Lieutenant Sunderstrom (ashore in San Diego)
 Lola Brooks as Lieutenant Hosgood, Bridie's secretary
 Ken Wayne as Lieutenant Benson
 Guy Doleman as Lieutenant Commander Farrel
 Richard Meikle as Davis
 John Meillon as Sawfish crewman Ralph Swain (ashore in San Francisco)
 Joe McCormick as Ackerman, radiation sickness victim
 Lou Vernon as Bill Davidson, Moira's father
 Kevin Brennan as Dr. King, radiation diagnosis doctor
 Keith Eden as Dr. Fletcher (beach scene)
 Basil Buller-Murphy as Sir Douglas Froude
 Brian James as Royal Australian Navy officer
 John Casson as Salvation Army captain
 Paddy Moran as Stevens (club wine steward)
 Grant Taylor as Morgan (Holmes party)
 George Fairfax (Holmes party guest)
 Earl Francis (Holmes party guest)
 Pat Port (Runner on Beach)
 Cary Peck (uncredited)

Production
As in the novel, much of On the Beach takes place in Melbourne, close to the southernmost part of the Australian mainland. Principal photography took place from January 15 to March 27, 1959. The film was shot in Berwick, then a town outside Melbourne, and Frankston, described in the film as 45 minutes away from Melbourne. The scene where Peck meets Gardner as she arrives from Melbourne by rail was filmed on platform #1 of Frankston railway station, now rebuilt. A subsequent scene, where Peck and Gardner are transported by horse and buggy, was filmed in Young Street, Frankston. Some streets which were being built at the time in Berwick were named after people involved in the film. Two examples are Shute Avenue (Nevil Shute) and Kramer Drive (Stanley Kramer).

The beach scenes were filmed at Canadian Bay Beach in Mount Eliza. The exterior of Peter and Mary's house was a real house in Mount Eliza. The General Post Office was used as the Department of the Navy building. Scenes were also filmed at Queenscliff High Light, the Shell Geelong Refinery, Melbourne Public Library, Flinders Street Station and Queen Victoria Memorial Hospital. 

Because Melbourne lacked conventional film studio facilities, the production leased the Melbourne Showgrounds from the Royal Agricultural Society of Victoria. The pavilions and office buildings of the complex were converted to a studio. Sets for Julian's garage, the interior of Peter and Mary's house, the lighthouse and the Sawfish submarine interiors were constructed in the Government Pavilion.

The "Australian Grand Prix" in the novel had the racing sequences filmed at Riverside Raceway in California and at Phillip Island Grand Prix Circuit, home to the present-day Australian Motorcycle Grand Prix, located near Cowes at Phillip Island. These scenes include an array of late-1950s sports cars, including examples of the Jaguar XK150 and Jaguar D-Type, Porsche 356, Mercedes-Benz 300 SL "Gullwing", AC Ace, Chevrolet Corvette, Swallow Doretti and prominent in sequences was the "Chuck Porter Special", a customized Mercedes 300SL. Built by Hollywood body shop owner Chuck Porter and driven by a list of notable 1950s to 1960s west-coast racers, including Ken Miles and Chuck Stevenson, who purchased and successfully raced it in the early 1960s.

The U.S. Department of Defense refused to cooperate in the production of the film, not allowing access to its nuclear-powered submarines. The British submarine HMS Andrew was used to portray the fictional United States Navy nuclear-powered submarine USS Sawfish. Additional resources were supplied by the Royal Australian Navy, including the use of HMAS Melbourne. The exteriors of the Navy base were filmed at Williamstown Naval Dockyard.

Ava Gardner's wardrobe was created for her in Rome by the Fontana Sisters, three iconic Italian fashion designers, who had previously dressed Gardner in The Barefoot Contessa and The Sun Also Rises.

It has been claimed that Ava Gardner described Melbourne as "the perfect place to make a film about the end of the world." However, the purported quote was invented by journalist Neil Jillett, who was writing for The Sydney Morning Herald at the time. His original draft of a tongue-in-cheek piece about the making of the film said that he had not been able to confirm a third-party report that Ava Gardner had made this remark. The newspaper's sub-editor changed it to read as a direct quotation from Gardner. It was published in that form and entered Melbourne folklore very quickly.

Frank Chacksfield's orchestral performance of the love theme from On the Beach was released as a single in 1960, reaching #47 on the Billboard Hot 100 chart.

Differences between the novel and film

Nevil Shute was displeased with the final cut of the film, feeling that too many changes had been made at the expense of the story's integrity. After initial collaboration with Kramer, it was obvious that Shute's concerns were not being addressed; subsequently, he provided minimal assistance to the production. Gregory Peck agreed with Shute but, in the end, producer/director Stanley Kramer's ideas won out. Shute felt that Captain Towers and Moira having a love affair ruined a central element of the novel, that is, Towers' fidelity to his long-dead American wife.

In the beginning of the novel, it is stated that World War III started when Albania launched a nuclear attack against Italy. Afterwards, Egypt used Soviet built aircraft to make nuclear bombings on the United States and the United Kingdom, which, in turn, provoked the US and NATO to launch retaliation attacks against the Soviet Union, thus triggering the slow and painful death of the human race as the radiation from the attacks began to spread south. In the beginning of the movie, no nuclear attacks are shown, but the action opens on the USS Sawfish as it makes its way towards Melbourne. Later, after the Sawfish leaves Ralph Swain in San Francisco and heads towards San Diego, the crew makes discussions on how a book about World War III could be written, but as details of the war to them are sketchy, they are at a loss as to who started the war (though one crewman states that America didn't start the war and another crewman wishes that somebody could've prevented the war before it broke out) and make jokes about Martians, who might know the answer, but take over Earth once the radiation levels drop. When they ask Osborn for his opinion on who started the war, Osborn first answers Albert Einstein, blaming him for finding the equation that resulted in the discovery of atomic power and the creation of nuclear weapons, but comes up with a better hypothesis on how the war could've started accidentally. In Osborn's hypothesis, somewhere in one of the Eastern European nations, a man on radar duty saw incoming objects on the radar screen and mistook them for missiles launched by their enemies (though it's likely the incoming objects may have been a flock of birds) and, without hesitation (for doing so, he feared, would've resulted in his nation getting hit) pressed the button that launched the first nuclear missiles of the war. Upon finishing his hypothesis, Osborn then comments on how mankind by that time had become stupid enough to cause his own extinction through weapons they couldn't use responsibly without regarding the consequences first.

In the novel it has been two years since the last nuclear attacks, and small pockets of human survivors are mentioned in several areas of the Southern Hemisphere. Australia is in radio contact with places such as Montevideo, on the east coast of South America, and Cape Town, on the southern tip of Africa. Commander Towers is in communication with the only other remaining active-duty United States Navy vessel, another nuclear submarine, USS Swordfish, on duty in the Atlantic, which, at the end, is based in Montevideo. Melbourne, where much of the novel is set, is the southernmost major city in the world. It will be the last such to die, but people in New Zealand, Tierra del Fuego and other, more southerly points than Australia, are said to have a few additional weeks left to them. In the film an unidentified radio newscaster says that, as far as is known, Australia is home to the last human life on the planet. This to possibly build hope that the San Francisco expedition will result in the discovery of other survivors, adding a sense of urgency and importance to Melbourne's survivors.

In the film there is no USS Swordfish, only the submarine USS Scorpion. For the film, Scorpion is renamed Sawfish, and the boat comes to represent the last (known) hope for humanity. The film's production crew was forced to use a non-nuclear, diesel-electric Royal Navy submarine HMS Andrew, as a stand-in for the nuclear-powered Sawfish.

Several major and minor characters were altered, removed, or created specifically for the film adaptation. The novel's Moira Davidson, a slender, petite pale blonde in her mid-twenties, was portrayed by the tall, curvaceous, 36-year-old brunette Ava Gardner. Nuclear scientist John Osborne, a 20-something bachelor in the novel, is portrayed in the film by 60-year-old Fred Astaire and is named Julian Osborn. Moira and John are cousins in the novel, while Moira and Julian are former lovers in the film.

Admiral Bridie and his secretary, Lieutenant Hosgood, are film characters not in the novel.

In the film, random Morse code radio signals coming from San Diego give rise to hope that there are survivors on the U.S. west coast. In the novel, the signals are coming from a naval training base farther north, near Seattle. The idea of a survivor sending random signals is dismissed in the novel as ridiculous. Towers says that even someone who didn't know Morse code would sit there with a Morse book and send at about five words per minute. The film's characters, however, hold out hope that there could be a person on the other end of the telegraph (this is possibly used as a plot device to build suspense and hope). The main reason in the novel for the expedition is to learn if there are indeed survivors. Rather than a telegraph operator, the characters hold out hope that, without the intercession of technicians and maintenance workers, the possibility of telegraph power being supplied after all that time would be remote at best. It turns out that, as in the film, the power station has been running on its own since the war, but it is beginning to break down from lack of maintenance, particularly the lubrication needed to prevent overheating. Just as in the film, the power station is shut down before the submarine sails for home.

During Lt. Sunderstrom's search in the film for the signals' author, he is given just one hour, while in the novel, he is given two hours to find the source. Just like the novel, Sunderstrom's radiation suit doesn't have a wrist watch to help him keep track of his time ashore, so the submarine crew alerts him with horn blasts every quarter of an hour. In the film, a single horn blast was given every fifteen minutes, and Sunderstrom is ordered to return immediately after hearing the third blast. In the novel, the submarine crew gives one horn blast for a quarter of an hour, two for half an hour, three for three quarters, and four for a whole hour. He's ordered to stop what he's doing at five horn blasts (1 1/4 hours) and return at six horn blasts (1 1/2 hours). In the novel, Sunderstrom finds several bodies during his search, while in the film, there are no dead bodies at the power station. While Sunderstrom finds the source of the signals, he discovers in the novel that it's a window shade cord caught on a telegraph key. In the film he finds it's an overturned Coke bottle snagged in a window shade cord above the telegraph key. Ocean breezes, in both cases, are blowing through an open window making the window shade disturb the telegraph key. Sunderstrom sends a proper Morse message to describe how they have traveled all that way for nothing. In both the novel and the film, while Sunderstrom receives his return orders, the captain also warns him not to bring any souvenirs aboard, as they could be contaminated with radioactivity. In the novel, after Sunderstrom shuts off the power station, he explores a bit and defies his orders by bringing aboard three of the last printed issues of the Saturday Evening Post, so he catches up on a serial that was running when the war started. In the film, after Sunderstrom sends his message, he follows Towers's orders to not bring aboard any souvenirs and is already en route to Sawfish when he hears the final horn blast.

In the film San Francisco's buildings are completely undamaged, with one memorable shot occurring when Sawfish first passes under the intact Golden Gate Bridge. In the novel the city has been largely destroyed and the bridge has fallen into the bay.

In the novel, the northernmost point of the submarine's journey is the Gulf of Alaska while the film uses Point Barrow.

Towers and Moira attend the Australian Grand Prix and go to the mountains afterwards in the film. In the novel, they are vacationing in the mountains on the day of the race, and they hear a radio report of John Osborne's first-place finish.

The novel ends with a dying Moira sitting in her car, having taken her suicide pills, while watching Scorpion head out to sea to be scuttled. Unlike the novel, no mention of scuttling the submarine is made in the film. Instead, Commander Towers's crew asks that he attempt to take them back to the U.S., where they can die on their home soil. Although he realizes that they probably will not survive a second passage north, he does as they request. In the film Ava Gardner is merely watching the submarine submerge and disappear beneath the sea and is not shown taking her suicide pills.

Release and reception
On the Beach premiered in 18 theaters on all seven continents on December 17, 1959. The Hollywood premiere was attended by the film's stars Fred Astaire and Anthony Perkins, director Stanley Kramer, and other celebrities including Cary Grant. The New York premiere was attended by Mayor Robert F. Wagner Jr. The London premiere was attended by Soviet Ambassador to the United Kingdom Yakov Malik. Star Ava Gardner attended the Rome premiere. The Tokyo premiere was attended by members of the Japanese Imperial Family. The Stockholm premiere was attended by King Gustav VI Adolf. The Melbourne premiere was attended by Premier of Victoria Henry Bolte. Other premieres were held in West Berlin, Caracas, Chicago, Johannesburg, Lima, Paris, Toronto, Washington, D.C. and Zurich The film also was screened in a theater at Little America in Antarctica.

Although the film had no commercial release in the Soviet Union, a special premiere was arranged for that night in Moscow. Gregory Peck and his wife traveled to Russia for the screening, which was held at a workers' club with 1,200 Soviet dignitaries, the foreign press corps, and diplomats including U.S. Ambassador Llewellyn Thompson attending.

On the Beach recorded a loss of $700,000 and received mixed reviews. It acquired a fan base that agreed on many of the issues presented. Bosley Crowther in his contemporary review in The New York Times saw the film as delivering a powerful message.

The review in Variety was somber: "On the Beach is a solid film of considerable emotional, as well as cerebral, content. But the fact remains that the final impact is as heavy as a leaden shroud. The spectator is left with the sick feeling that he's had a preview of Armageddon, in which all contestants lost."

Stanley Kauffmann of The New Republic wrote: "When the film hews close to its theme, it is effective and valuable; when it deals with its characters as characters, it is often phony. Just as we are gripped by horror, along comes a pure Hollywood touch to remind us that what we are watching is only a movie".

In a later appraisal of both novel and film, historian Paul Brians (Nuclear Holocausts: Atomic War in Fiction, 1895-1964 (1987)) considered the novel "inferior" to the film. His contention was that the portrayal of nuclear annihilation on screen was more accurate as it was clear that the world was coming to an end.

On Rotten Tomatoes, the film holds a 77% approval rating, based on 22 reviews, with an average rating of 6.4/10.

Box Office
Kine Weekly called it a "money maker" at the British box office in 1960.

Awards
Stanley Kramer won the 1960 BAFTA for best director and Ernest Gold won the 1960 Golden Globe for Best Motion Picture Score. It was nominated for Academy Awards in two categories:

Remake
On the Beach was remade in 2000 as an Australian television film by Southern Star Productions, directed by Russell Mulcahy and starring Armand Assante, Bryan Brown, and Rachel Ward. It originally aired on Showtime. The remake of the 1959 film was also based on the 1957 novel by Nevil Shute, but updates the setting of the story to the film's then-future of 2005, starting with placing the crew on the fictional Los Angeles–class USS Charleston (SSN-704) submarine and also changing the final actions of Towers.

Documentary
The 2013 documentary Fallout by Melbourne filmmaker Lawrence Johnston explores Shute's life and Kramer's making of On the Beach, with interviews of Shute's daughter, Kramer's wife Karen, and Donna Anderson, one of the film's surviving cast members. Fallout was produced by Peter Kaufmann.

See also
 List of American films of 1959
 List of apocalyptic films
 Survival film, about the film genre, with a list of related films

References

Notes

Citations

Bibliography

 Balio, Tino. United Artists: The Company That Changed the Film Industry. Madison, Wisconsin: University of Wisconsin Press, 1987. .
 Fishgall, Gary. Gregory Peck: A Biography. New York: Scribner, 2002. .
 Gillett, Ross. HMAS Melbourne: 25 Years. Sydney, NSW: Nautical Press, 1980. .
 Lind, Lew. The Royal Australian Navy: Historic Naval Events Year by Year (2nd ed.). Frenchs Forest, NSW: Reed Books 1986, First edition 1982. .
 Mitchell, Charles P. "On the Beach (1959)." A Guide to Apocalyptic Cinema. Westport, Connecticut: Greenwood Press, 2001. .
 Shute, Nevil. On The Beach. New York: William Morrow and Company, 1957.
 Warren, Bill. Keep Watching The Skies, American Science Fiction Movies of the 1950s, Vol II: 1958 - 1962. Jefferson, North Carolina: McFarland & Company, 1982. .
 Weaver, Roslyn. "Nevil Schute: On the Beach (1957)." Apocalypse in Australian Fiction and Film: A Critical Study. Jefferson, North Carolina: McFarland & Company, 2011. .

External links

 
 
 
 
 
 Geoff Stanton, "Apocalypse Then: the Making of On the Beach", Filmink Magazine 2010
 On the Beach: Filming the 1959 Feature Film at Australian Screen Online
 On the Beach at Oz Movies
 Waltzing Matilda Finale at YouTube

1959 films
1950s disaster films
1950s science fiction drama films
American disaster films
American science fiction drama films
Apocalyptic films
1950s English-language films
American black-and-white films
Films scored by Ernest Gold
Films about nuclear war and weapons
Films about suicide
Films based on Australian novels
Films directed by Stanley Kramer
Films set in 1964
Films set in Victoria (Australia)
Films set in California
Films set in Melbourne
Films set in the future
Films shot in Melbourne
American post-apocalyptic films
Science fiction submarine films
United Artists films
Films about the United States Navy
Films about World War III
Films produced by Stanley Kramer
American survival films
1959 drama films
Films set in San Diego
1950s American films